The Cave Girl is a 1921 American silent drama film directed by Joseph J. Franz and featuring Teddie Gerard, Charles Meredith, Lillian Tucker and Boris Karloff in an early film role. The source for the William Parker screenplay was the stage play of the same name by George Middleton and Guy Bolton. The film's tagline was "A Romance of Silent Trails and Rushing Waters... A Drama of Youth Gone Wild... Enacted in the Yosemite Valley in the Middle of Winter." (Print Ad in the Ludington Daily News, ((Ludington, Mich.)) 18 May 1923). The film is presumed lost.

Plot
Professor Sperry moves to a cave in the wilderness to live the primitive life, taking his daughter Margot with him.

Meanwhile, Divvy Bates is being pressured to marry Elsie Case. Elsie's mother and Divvy's wealthy father arrange a trip to the Bates' remote cabin in the wilderness to give Elsie a chance to extract a marriage proposal from Divvy. At the cabin, Divvy catches Margot making a raid on the Bates' supplies and is attracted to her. Elsie now has to compete with Margot for Divvy's affections.

When their hired hand Baptiste (Boris Karloff) is fired, he retaliates by burning down their cabin. The party is forced to seek refuge in the cave along with the Professor and Margot. Seeing her chance to marry Divvy slipping away, Elsie conspires with Baptiste to kidnap Margot who ends up being set adrift in a canoe. Elsie's conscience suffers and she realizes that she has done wrong. Elsie confesses to Divvy, who then rescues Margot from the rapids in the nick of time.

Cast
 Charles Meredith as Divvy Bates
 Lillian Tucker as Elsie Case
 Jacob Abrams as Prof. Orlando Sperry (credited as Jake Abrahams)
 Teddie Gerard as Margot
 Boris Karloff as Baptiste, a villainous half-breed
 Elinor Hancock as Mrs. Georgia Case (credited as Eleanor Hancock)
 Frank J. Coleman as Rufus Petterson
 Wilton Taylor as J.T. Bates
 John Beck as Rogers

Production
Cave Girl was made by Jesse D. Hampton Productions and completed in February 1921. Exteriors were filmed in Yosemite Valley in the winter of 1920–21. Inspiration Pictures acquired the film from Hampton Productions in May, 1921, and released it in December.

Release
Charles Duell, the head of Inspiration Pictures, arranged to screen the picture for the first time at governor's mansion in New York, June 1921. The governor had recently spearheaded legislation that resulted in the formation of New York's Motion Picture Commission, a committee tasked with the censorship of films.

In February 1922 Film Daily gave it a positive review due primarily to the photography and the exteriors: "For winter scenery and fine out-of-doors atmosphere The Cave Girl belongs way up in the front rank and even if the story isn't a whopper, the feature as a whole will be likely to satisfy because of its splendid pictorial appeal."

See also
 Boris Karloff filmography

References

External links

1921 films
1921 drama films
1921 lost films
Silent American drama films
American silent feature films
American black-and-white films
First National Pictures films
Lost American films
Films directed by Joseph Franz
Lost drama films
1920s American films
1920s English-language films